Mordellistena lucida is a beetle in the genus Mordellistena of the family Mordellidae. It was described in 1990 by Batten. It is known from Papua New Guinea.

References

lucida
Beetles described in 1990